Saros cycle series 121 for lunar eclipses occurs at the moon's descending node. It began in 1029 and will end in 2526. It contains 84 member lunar eclipses, each separated by 18 years 11 and 1/3 days, and will last 1496.5 years.

The series contains 29 total lunar eclipses between 1560 and 2021. It contains seven partial eclipses from 1398 to 1490 and seven more between 2039 and 2147.

The last occurrence of this series was the last total lunar eclipse on May 26, 2021. The next occurrence on June 6, 2039 will be the first partial lunar eclipse, second set of partial lunar eclipses of this series.

The longest totality occurred at series member 26, on October 18, 1660, lasting 102 minutes.

This lunar saros is linked to Solar Saros 128.

List

See also 
 List of lunar eclipses
 List of Saros series for lunar eclipses

External links 
 Lunar Eclipses of Saros 121, Fred Espenak
 www.hermit.org: Saros 121

Lunar saros series